Siremata is a genus of curtain web spiders first described by V. Passanha & Antônio Domingos Brescovit in 2018.  it contains only three species.

References

External links

Dipluridae
Mygalomorphae genera